The 1988 Major League Baseball All-Star Game was the 59th playing of the "Midsummer Classic" between Major League Baseball's American League (AL) and National League All-Star teams. The All-Star Game was held on July 12, 1988, at Riverfront Stadium in Cincinnati, Ohio, the home of the NL's Cincinnati Reds.

The game resulted in the AL defeating the NL 2-1. Terry Steinbach, a catcher for the AL's Oakland Athletics, won the All-Star game's most valuable player award. Steinbach was credited with both of the AL's two runs in the game. Frank Viola of the Minnesota Twins was the winning pitcher.

All-Star rosters
Players in italics have since been inducted into the National Baseball Hall of Fame.

American League

National League

All-Star Game

Coaching staff

Umpires

Starting lineups

Game summary

Footnotes and references

External links
Baseball-Reference.com
Lineups, boxscore, and more

Major League Baseball All-Star Game
Major League Baseball All-Star Game
Baseball competitions in Cincinnati
1980s in Cincinnati
Major League Baseball All Star Game
July 1988 sports events in the United States